ZNS-3-FM (branded as Power 104.5) is a radio station in the Bahamas, having begun broadcasting as an FM repeater of ZNS-3, at the time the "Northern Service", before separating and adopting its current music format. It is under ownership of the Broadcasting Corporation of The Bahamas.

External links
 Broadcasting Corporation of The Bahamas

Radio stations in the Bahamas